The men's C-1 1000 metres sprint canoeing event at the 2020 Summer Olympics took place on 6 and 7 August 2021 at the Sea Forest Waterway. At least 12 canoeists from at least 12 nations competed.

Background
This was the 20th appearance of the event, one of four events to be held at every Summer Games since canoeing was introduced in 1936.

The reigning World Champion was Isaquias Queiroz of Brazil; Queiroz took silver at Rio 2016. The reigning Olympic champion is Sebastian Brendel of Germany, who is on the German team after qualifying in C-2 and is eligible to be selected as a second canoeist in C-1.

Qualification

A National Olympic Committee (NOC) could only qualify one boat (and thus earn one women's canoe quota place) in the event; however, NOCs could enter up to 2 boats in the event if they had enough women's canoe quota places from other events (that is, the C-2). A total of 12 qualification places were available, initially allocated as follows:

 1 place for the host nation, Japan
 5 places awarded through the 2019 ICF Canoe Sprint World Championships
 5 places awarded through continental tournaments, 1 per continent
 1 place awarded through the 2021 Canoe Sprint World Cup Stage 2.

Qualifying places were awarded to the NOC, not to the individual canoeist who earned the place.

Isaquias Queiroz of Brazil qualified in both the C-2 and the C-1, resulting in an additional quota place added to the C-2 (no additional place in C-1). This made a total of 4 World Championship places that were awarded as follows:

The Americas continental tournament was cancelled; that place was allocated through the World Championships, with the place going to Cuba. One of the two Tripartite Commission invitational spots in canoeing was extended to Joaquim Lobo of Mozambique. Asia's continental place was earned by China, Europe's by Ukraine, Africa's by Tunisia, and Oceania's by Samoa (after Australia declined the spot). Moldova earned the final spot at the World Cup.:

Nations that could enter (additional) boats due to qualifying in the C-2:

Competition format
Sprint canoeing uses a four-round format for events with at least 11 boats, with heats, quarterfinals, semifinals, and finals. The details for each round depend on how many boats ultimately enter.

The course is a flatwater course 9 metres wide. The name of the event describes the particular format within sprint canoeing. The "C" format means a canoe, with the canoeist kneeling and using a single-bladed paddle to paddle and steer (as opposed to a kayak, with a seated canoeist, double-bladed paddle, and foot-operated rudder). The "1" is the number of canoeists in each boat. The "1000 metres" is the distance of each race.

Schedule
The event was held over two consecutive days, with two rounds per day. All sessions started at 9:30 a.m. local time, though there were multiple events with races in each session.

Results

Heats
Progression System: 1st-2nd to SF, rest to QF.

Heat 1

Heat 2

Heat 3

Heat 4

Heat 5

Quarterfinals
Progression System: 1st-2nd to SF, rest out.

Quarterfinal 1

Quarterfinal 2

Quarterfinal 3

Semifinals
Progression System: 1st-4th to Final A, rest to Final B.

Semifinal 1

Semifinal 2

Finals

Final A

Final B

References

Men's C-1 1000 metres
Men's events at the 2020 Summer Olympics